Valentín "Sirique" González (1876 - death date unknown) was a Cuban baseball center fielder in the Cuban League. He played from 1890 to 1912 with several ballclubs, mostly with the Habana club. He also played for the Jacksonville Jays of the South Atlantic League in 1905 and 1906. He was elected to the Cuban Baseball Hall of Fame in 1939.

References

External links

1876 births
Year of death missing
Cuban League players
Punzo players
Jacksonville Jays players
Club Fé players
Baseball catchers
Cuban expatriate baseball players in the United States